EUSO or Euso may refer to:

 EUSO mission, a mission of the European Space Agency
 EUSO, European Union Science Olympiad, a team-based youth science competition
 Euso (spider), a genus of spiders in the family Ochyroceratidae
 Euso, an old Gascon name for the French town of Eauze

See also 
 USO (disambiguation)
 EUSOILS, the European Soil Database